The third season of the French version of Dancing with the Stars debuted on TF1 on October 6, 2012. 10 celebrities were paired with 10 professional ballroom dancers. Sandrine Quétier and Vincent Cerutti return as the hosts for this season.

Participants
The participants of the season were officially announced by TF1 on September 18, 2012, though they were leaked a few days earlier by various media outlets.

Controversies
On the eve of the program's premiere, two participants, singers Lorie and Amel Bent, were accused by the magazine Oops of "cheating" by having started their training much earlier than the other contestants. Both girls went on to share the top spot on the show's first and second broadcast.
The hiring of singer Shy'm, the previous season's winner, as a fourth judge has drawn some criticism about her legitimacy compared to her professional dancer colleagues, as well as cast doubt on her objectivity due to her friendly acquaintance of several contestants, such as Lorie, Chimène Badi and Amel Bent.

Scoring

Red numbers indicate the couples with the lowest score for each week.
Blue numbers indicate the couples with the highest score for each week.
 indicates the couples eliminated that week.
 indicates the returning couple that finished in the bottom two.
 indicates the winning couple.
 indicates the runner-up couple.
 indicates the third place couple.

Averages 
This table only counts dances scored on the traditional 40-point scale (the scores for the Coach Battle from Week 3 and the Samba Relay from Week 4 are not included).

Highest and lowest scoring performances
The best and worst performances in each dance according to the judges' marks are as follows:

Couples' Highest and lowest scoring performances
According to the traditional 40-point scale.

Styles, scores and songs

Week 1 

 Individual judges scores in the chart below (given in parentheses) are listed in this order from left to right:: Marie-Claude Pietragalla, Jean-Marc Généreux, Shy'm, Chris Marques.

Running order

Week 2: Personal Story Week 

 Individual judges scores in the chart below (given in parentheses) are listed in this order from left to right:: Marie-Claude Pietragalla, Jean-Marc Généreux, Shy'm, Chris Marques.

Running order

Week 3: 80s Week 

 Individual judges scores in the chart below (given in parentheses) are listed in this order from left to right:: Marie-Claude Pietragalla, Jean-Marc Généreux, Shy'm, Chris Marques.

Running order

Week 4: Symphony Orchestra Week 

 Individual judges scores in the chart below (given in parentheses) are listed in this order from left to right:: Marie-Claude Pietragalla, Jean-Marc Généreux, Shy'm, Chris Marques.

Running order

Week 5: Cinema Week 

 Individual judges scores in the chart below (given in parentheses) are listed in this order from left to right:: Marie-Claude Pietragalla, Jean-Marc Généreux, Shy'm, Chris Marques.

Running order

Week 6: 15 Second Solo Week 

 Individual judges scores in the chart below (given in parentheses) are listed in this order from left to right:: Marie-Claude Pietragalla, Jean-Marc Généreux, Shy'm, Chris Marques.

Running order

Week 7: Trio challenge 

 Individual judges scores in the chart below (given in parentheses) are listed in this order from left to right:: Marie-Claude Pietragalla, Jean-Marc Généreux, Shy'm, Chris Marques.

Running order

Week 8: Semi-finals 

 Individual judges scores in the chart below (given in parentheses) are listed in this order from left to right:: Marie-Claude Pietragalla, Jean-Marc Généreux, Shy'm, Chris Marques.

Running order

Week 9: Final 

 Individual judges scores in the chart below (given in parentheses) are listed in this order from left to right:: Marie-Claude Pietragalla, Jean-Marc Généreux, Shy'm, Chris Marques.

Running order

Call-Out Order 
The Table Lists in which order the contestants' fates were revealed by Quétier and Cerutti.

 This couple came in first place with the judges.
 This couple came in last place with the judges.
 This couple came in last place with the judges and was eliminated.
 This couple was eliminated.
 This couple won the competition.
 This couple came in second in the competition.
 This couple came in third in the competition.

Dance Chart
The celebrities and professional partners danced one of these routines for each corresponding week.
Week 1 : Cha-Cha-Cha, Tango or Quickstep
Week 2 : Foxtrot, Jive, Pasodoble, Samba or Viennese Waltz (Personal Story week)
Week 3 : Cha-cha-cha, Foxtrot, Jive, Pasodoble, Rumba or Tango (80s week)
Week 4 : Foxtrot, Pasodoble, Rumba or Tango (Symphony Orchestra week)
Week 5 : American Smooth, Cha-cha-cha, Pasodoble, Rumba, Salsa, Tango or Waltz (Cinema week)
Week 6 : Cha-cha-cha, Foxtrot, Jive, Quickstep, Rumba, Samba, Tango or Waltz (15 Second Solo week)
Week 7 : American Smooth, Foxtrot, Jive, Pasodoble, Quickstep, Rumba or Tango (Trio challenge week)
Week 8 : American Smooth, Cha-cha-cha, Pasodoble, Rumba, Salsa, Samba or Waltz (Semi finals)
Week 9 : Foxtrot, Freestyle, Jive, Pasodoble, Rumba or Tango (Final)

 Highest scoring dance
 Lowest scoring dance
 Danced, but not scored

Musical Guests

France television ratings

Around the Show 
A notable contestant for the season was then 30-year-old Lorie, a singer wildly popular in the early 2000s that TF1 has tried to get on the previous two seasons but who had previously declined because she felt that as an accomplished dancer, her participation would be unfair to the other contestants. However, with her sixth album Regarde-Moi proving to be a huge commercial failure and causing her to split from her label, she evidently changed her mind and even timed the release of her next album Danse with the show. The strategy was unsuccessful as Danse sold even less copies than Regarde-Moi, forcing Lorie to cancel her planned 2013 concert tour.

People who are known to have been in negotiations for a spot include actor Laurent Ournac, as well as singers Alizée, who claimed in interview to be excited at the prospect, and Eve Angeli, who broke negotiations as she didn't want to be on the same season as Lorie.

References

Season 03
2012 French television seasons